1906 is the first album by South African music project Bambata. The name of the album refers to the Zulu rebellion against the English in the Colony of Natal (modern Kwazulu-Natal) in 1906, led by Chief Bambatha kaMancinza (ca. 1860–1906?). The Zulu rebelled against a poll tax introduced by the English.

The album was a result of collaboration between Sipho Sithole, director and founder of the Native Rhythms Productions, Philangezwi Bongani Nkwanyana, Mathufela Zuma and Bheki Khoza.

1906 was nominated for three categories in the South African Music Awards 2001:
Best Newcomer
Best Zulu Music and
Best Adult Contemporary Album: African.

Sipho Sithole was also nominated for Best Producer.

Track listing
Adapted from the liner notes.

1. 1906 (Philangezwi Bongani Nkwanyana)
 Bongani Nkwanyana, lead vocals, Maskandi guitar
 Phuzekhemisi, guest vocals and Maskandi guitar
 Bhezi Khoza, acoustic guitar
 Mandla Zikalala, bass guitar
 Mthandeni Mvelase, keyboards
 Kwazi Shange, drums
 Godfrey Mgcina, percussion
2. Uzondo (Maxhegwana Johannes Zuma)
 Mathufel Zuma, lead vocals, Maskandi guitar
 Johnny Chonco, acoustic and electric guitars
 Mandla Zikalala, bass guitar
 Mthandeni Mvelase, keyboards
 Kwazi Shange, drums
 Godfrey Mgcina, percussion
3. Ijele (Sipho Sithole)
 Sipho Sithole, lead vocals
 Bhezi Khoza, acoustic guitar
 Johnny Chonco, acoustic and electric guitars
 Mandla Zikalala, bass guitar
 Kwazi Shange, drums
 Godfrey Mgcina, percussion
4. Izinkomo Zamalobolo (Philangezwi Bongani Nkwanyana)
 Bongani Nkwanyana, vocals, Maskandi guitar
 Khululiwe Stihole, guest vocals
 Bhezi Khoza, acoustic guitar
 Mandla Zikalala, bass guitar
 Mthandeni Mvelase, keyboards
 Kwazi Shange, drums
 Godfrey Mgcina, percussion
5. Amavumantombi (Maxhegwana Johannes Zuma)
 Bongani Nkwanyana, lead vocals, Maskandi guitar
 Mathufel Zuma, lead vocals, Maskandi guitar
 Bhezi Khoza, acoustic guitar
 Mandla Zikalala, bass guitar
 Mthandeni Mvelase, keyboards
 Kwazi Shange, drums
 Godfrey Mgcina, percussion
 Steve Dryer, brass
6. Isandundundu (Philangezwi Bongani Nkwanyana)
 Bongani Nkwanyana, vocals, Maskandi guitar
 Sipho Sithole, praise poet
 Bhezi Khoza, acoustic guitar
 Herbie Tsoaeli, bass guitar
 Mthandeni Mvelase, keyboards
 Lulu Gontsana, drums
 Tlale Makhene, percussion
 Steve Dryer, brass
7. Amadlozi (Philangezwi Bongani Nkwanyana)
 Bhezi Khoza, acoustic guitar
 Johnny Chonco, acoustic and electric guitars
 Mandla Zikalala, bass guitar
 Mthandeni Mvelase, keyboards
 Kwazi Shange, drums
 Godfrey Mgcina, percussion
8. Ushaka (Bheki Khoza)
 Bhezi Khoza, lead vocals, acoustic guitar
 Mandla Zikalala, bass guitar
 Mthandeni Mvelase, keyboards
 Kwazi Shange, drums
 Godfrey Mgcina, percussion
 Steve Dryer, brass
9. Uyagaqa (Maxhegwana Johannes Zuma)
 Mathufel Zuma, lead vocals, Maskandi guitar
 Bhezi Khoza, acoustic guitar
 Mandla Zikalala, bass guitar
 Mthandeni Mvelase, keyboards
 Lulu Gontsana, drums
 Godfrey Mgcina and Tlale Makhene, percussion
10. Usathane (Philangezwi Bongani Nkwanyana)
 Bongani Nkwanyana, lead vocals, Maskandi guitar
 Sipho Sithole, praise poet
 Bhezi Khoza, acoustic guitar
 Herbie Tsoaeli, bass guitar
 Mthandeni Mvelase, keyboards
 Lulu Gontsana, drums
 Godfrey Mgcina and Tlale Makhene, percussion
11. Umziwenduna (Maxhegwana Johannes Zuma)
 Mathufel Zuma, lead vocals, Maskandi guitar
 Bhezi Khoza, acoustic guitar
 Herbie Tsoaeli, bass guitar
 Mthandeni Mvelase, keyboards
 Kwazi Shange, drums
 Godfrey Mgcina, percussion
12. Amahangula (Philangezwi Bongani Nkwanyana)
 Bongani Nkwanyana, lead vocals, Maskandi guitar
 Bhezi Khoza, acoustic guitar
 Mandla Zikalala, bass guitar
 Mthandeni Mvelase, keyboards
 Lulu Gontsana, drums
 Godfrey Mgcina and Tlale Makhene, percussion
 Steve Dryer, brass
 Vocals on all tracks:
 Khululiwe Sithole
 Maxwell Mntambo
 Morris Mbongwa
 Deborah Fraser
 Khanyo Maphumulu

Production
Adapted from the liner notes.
 Produced by: Jabu Khanyile & Sipho Sithole
 Engineer: Jasper Williams
 Mixing: Adrian Hamilton
 Mastering: Peter Pearlson at Forest Studios
 Recorded and mixed at Downtown Studios
 Original artwork: Fikile Magalela
 Sleeve design: Derick Taljaard
 Project Management: Native Rhythm Productions

References

Zulu music
Bambata (musical project) albums
2000 albums